Lake Township is one of twelve townships in Buchanan County, Missouri, USA.  As of the 2010 census, its population was 35.

Lake Township takes its name from Lake Contrary.

Geography

Transportation
Lake Township contains one airport or landing strip, Booze Island Airport.

References

External links
 US-Counties.com
 City-Data.com
 USGS Geographic Names Information System (GNIS)

Townships in Buchanan County, Missouri
Townships in Missouri